An independence referendum was held in the Armenia SSR on 21 September 1991 to determine whether to secede from the Soviet Union. It followed a declaration of independence on 23 August 1990. 99.5% of voters voted in favour, with a turnout of 95%. The country officially became an independent state on 23 September 1991.

Background 
The May 1990 Armenian Supreme Soviet election resulted in the formation of a non-Communist government led by Levon Ter-Petrosyan, chairman of the Pan-Armenian National Movement. In December 1990, Mikhail Gorbachev proposed a referendum on the continuation of the Soviet Union, as a federative state. The Ter-Petrosyan government rejected the proposal on 1 March 1991 and decided instead to hold a referendum on independence.

Results

Aftermath
Following the referendum, Soviet president Mikhail Gorbachev unsuccessfully attempted to persuade Armenia to join the Union of Soviet Sovereign Republics. However, the Armenian government signed an economic treaty with Russia that created a free-trade zone.

Levon Ter-Petrosyan was elected the first president of Armenia in November 1991 and Armenia formally gained independence on 26 December 1991.

See also
Independence Day (Armenia)

References

Bibliography 
 
 

Dissolution of the Soviet Union
Armenia
Armenia
1991 in Armenia
1991
Referendums in the Soviet Union
Constitutional history of Armenia